Love in the Hills is a 1911 American short silent drama film directed by D. W. Griffith and starring Blanche Sweet.

Cast
 Blanche Sweet as The Girl
 Wilfred Lucas as The Manley Suitor
 Charles West as The Shiftless Suitor
 Joseph Graybill as The City Suitor
 Kate Toncray as The Girl's Mother

See also
 D. W. Griffith filmography
 Blanche Sweet filmography

References

External links

a Blackhawk print of the film originally offered on ebay with booklet(archived)

1911 films
1911 short films
American silent short films
Biograph Company films
American black-and-white films
1911 drama films
Films directed by D. W. Griffith
Silent American drama films
1910s American films